Vyatka Governorate was a governorate of the Russian Empire and Russian SFSR, with its capital in city Vyatka (now known as Kirov), from 1796 to 1929. In the governorate’s area were situated most parts of modern Kirov Oblast and Udmurt Republic.

It was formed on territory of the historical lands of Vyatka.

Geography 
Vyatka Governorate was bordered with Vologda Governorate (to the north), Perm Governorate (to the east), Nizhny Novgorod and Kazan governorates (to the south), and Kostroma Governorate (to the west).

Administrative divisions 
The governorate was divided into 11 uyezds:
 Vyatsky Uyezd
 Glazovsky Uyezd
 Yelabuzhsky Uyezd
 Kotelnichsky Uyezd
 Malmyzhsky Uyezd
 Nolinsky Uyezd
 Orlovsky Uyezd
 Sarapulsky Uyezd
 Slobodskoy Uyezd
 Urzhumsky Uyezd
 Yaransky Uyezd

Population 
According to the 1897 census, the population of the Vyatka Governorate was 3,030,831.  Russian people composed 77.4% of the population; Udmurt people – 12.5%; Mari people – 4.8%, and Tatar people – 4.1%. According to 1958 data, the  population was 2,123,904; according 1910 data it was 3,747,000.

References

External links 
 Detailed map of Vyatka Governorate by A. A. Ilin, 1876

 
Governorates of the Russian Empire
Governorates of the Russian Soviet Federative Socialist Republic
1796 establishments in the Russian Empire
Kirov Oblast